WLGR (93.5 FM) is a radio station broadcasting a variety hits format. Licensed to Warrensburg, New York, United States, the station is owned by Ricki Lee Shorthouse and Aaron Ishmael, through licensee Loud Media LLC.

History
On July 1, 2019, the then-WSLP rebranded as "The Mix".

On September 18, 2020, WSLP changed its format from adult contemporary to variety hits, branded as "Lake FM".

On January 29, 2021, the WSLP call sign and "Lake FM" variety hits format moved from 93.3 FM Saranac Lake to 100.7 FM Ray Brook, while 93.3 FM changed its call sign to WPLA.

On May 1, 2021, WPLA began broadcasting at 93.5 FM in Warrensburg, New York with a variety hits format, branded as "Lake George Radio". On July 13, the station changed its call sign to WLGR to match.

Previous logos

References

External links

LGR
Radio stations established in 2007
2007 establishments in New York (state)
Adult hits radio stations in the United States